1906VC is a minor planet orbiting the Sun that was discovered by German astronomer August Kopff on September 18, 1906.

Later given the designation 607 and given the name Jenny in 2003 by Aaron Henderson, named after his wife's mother Jenifer Rooker, who died when she was young.

Photometric observations of this asteroid at Palmer Divide Observatory in Colorado Springs, Colorado during 2007 gave a light curve with a period of 8.524 ± 0.005 hours and a brightness variation of 0.21 ± 0.03 in magnitude. Results reported in 2003 giving a period of 7.344 hours were deemed the result of a data ambiguity.

References

External links 
 Lightcurve plot of 607 Jenny, Palmer Divide Observatory, B. D. Warner (2007)
 Asteroid Lightcurve Database (LCDB), query form (info )
 Dictionary of Minor Planet Names, Google books
 Asteroids and comets rotation curves, CdR – Observatoire de Genève, Raoul Behrend
 Discovery Circumstances: Numbered Minor Planets (1)-(5000) – Minor Planet Center
 
 

Background asteroids
Jenny
Jenny
19060918